The 1999 Pakistan cyclone (Joint Typhoon Warning Center designation: 02A; India Meteorological Department designation: ARB 01) was a deadly tropical cyclone that brought further devastation to a region struck by a powerful storm nearly a year earlier.

Meteorological history

An area of disturbed weather in the Arabian Sea was monitored in early May for possible development. Over the next two weeks, strong convection would develop before sunrise but dissipate by sunset. By May 16, the convection had become constant and a TCFA was issued at 0100Z. The low became a tropical storm by 0900Z. Tropical Storm 02A intensified as it moved to the northwest, and reached cyclone status on May 17 at 0600Z. The storm began to weaken as it continued inland over the Indus River Valley on May 21, before it completely dissipated on the next day.

Impact and aftermath

India
In India, officials evacuated more than 50,000 from coastal towns and cities as a precaution. However, the powerful cyclone caused relatively little damage during its passage. Moderate rainfall was recorded across Gujarat and only one person was killed. Some areas were cut off from the surrounding region after strong winds, estimated to have been between  downed power lines.

Pakistan
Upon striking Pakistan, officials feared the worst, with memories of the deadly 1998 Gujarat cyclone fresh in their minds. Reports released hours after the storm moved inland stated that at least 700 people were feared to be dead and at least 3,500 were thought to be missing. Hundreds of villages along the coastline were inundated by the cyclone's large storm surge and flooding rains. High winds downed power lines throughout the region, severing communication with many affected cities. In Karachi 70 km winds lashed the city with only little showers. At least 70% of the rice crop was estimated to have been lost due to the cyclone. Near the storm's center, wind gusts were estimated to have reached .

By May 23, officials in Pakistan recovered 200 bodies; 50 were found across islands of the mainland and 150 were in the Badin District. During a rescue attempt, 11 Pakistani soldiers were washed away in a swift current. None of the soldiers are believed to have survived the incident. Throughout the country, damage was estimated to have exceeded $6 million. By May 24, 400 bodies had been recovered but at least 6,000 more were known to be missing and believed dead. Many of these people are believed to have been swept out to sea.

Following the storm's destructive landfall, hundreds of soldiers from the Pakistan army were deployed to the region. They assisted in search and rescue operations as well as relocating survivors to shelters. According to the Associated Press, the Government of Pakistan made no attempts to evacuate residents before the cyclone made landfall, likely resulting in the large number of fatalities. At least $1 million in relief funds was to be supplied by the government.

Records

Upon reaching its peak intensity, the storm became the most intense cyclone ever recorded in the Arabian Sea since records began. It surpassed the record set just a year earlier by Extremely Severe Cyclonic Storm ARB 02 which attained winds of 165 km/h (105 mph 3-minute sustained) and a minimum pressure of 958 mbar (hPa). Since then, the storm has been surpassed as the strongest in the region. In June 2007, Cyclone Gonu became the first Category 5-equivalent storm ever recorded in the area. Additionally, the JTWC estimated that another storm, Cyclone Phet in 2010, attained higher sustained winds than ARB 01 in 1999; however, the IMD does not support this as it is based on one minute mean. IMD calculate windspeed based on three-minute mean. This Cyclone is the only Major Cyclone and Extremely Severe Cyclone to make Landfall in Pakistan.

See also

1999 North Indian Ocean cyclone season
1998 Gujarat cyclone
Cyclone Tauktae

References

Extremely severe cyclonic storms
Pakistan cyclone
Tropical cyclones in Pakistan
Non-combat military operations involving Pakistan